John Brownell may refer to:

John Brownell (politician) (1765–1809), member of the Legislative Assembly of Upper Canada
John C. Brownell (1877–1961), American actor and playwright